The following is a list of state highways in the U.S. state of Louisiana designated in the 150-199 range.

Louisiana Highway 150

Louisiana Highway 150 (LA 150) runs  in an east–west direction from a junction with US 80 and LA 563 in Simsboro to a junction with the concurrent US 80, US 167, and LA 146 in Ruston, Lincoln Parish.

Louisiana Highway 151

Louisiana Highway 151 (LA 151) runs  in a general east–west direction from a junction with US 80, US 80 Truck, and LA 9 in Arcadia, Bienville Parish around the north side of the Ruston area to LA 546 at Cadeville, Ouachita Parish.

Louisiana Highway 152

Louisiana Highway 152 (LA 152) runs  in a northwest to southeast direction from LA 2 east of Lisbon, Claiborne Parish to LA 151 west of Dubach, Lincoln Parish.

Louisiana Highway 153

Louisiana Highway 153 (LA 153) runs  in a north–south direction from a junction with LA 9 and LA 156 in Creston, Natchitoches Parish to a junction with LA 4 and LA 507 in Castor, Bienville Parish.

Louisiana Highway 154

Louisiana Highway 154 (LA 154) runs  in a southwest to northeast direction from US 71 at Elm Grove, Bossier Parish to a junction with LA 9 and LA 518 in Athens, Claiborne Parish.

Louisiana Highway 155

Louisiana Highway 155 (LA 155) runs  in an east–west direction from a junction with US 71 and US 371 in Coushatta, Red River Parish to LA 146 east of Quitman, Jackson Parish.

Louisiana Highway 156

Louisiana Highway 156 (LA 156) runs  in an east–west direction from a junction with LA 9 and LA 153 in Creston, Natchitoches Parish to US 167 north of Winnfield, Winn Parish.

Louisiana Highway 157

Louisiana Highway 157 (LA 157) runs  in a general north–south direction from US 71 at McDade, Bossier Parish to a junction with LA 159 and LA 615 north of Shongaloo, Webster Parish.

Louisiana Highway 158

Louisiana Highway 158 (LA 158) runs  from LA 8 in Colfax to a local road north of Colfax.

Louisiana Highway 159

Louisiana Highway 159 (LA 159) runs  in a north–south direction from a junction with I-20 and US 371 in Minden to the Arkansas state line north of Shongaloo, Webster Parish.

Louisiana Highway 160

Louisiana Highway 160 (LA 160) runs  in an east–west direction from a local road north of Benton, Bossier Parish to a junction with LA 2 and LA 159 at Leton, Webster Parish.

Louisiana Highway 161

Louisiana Highway 161 (LA 161) runs  from LA 2 Alt. in Gordon to AR 15 at Arkansas state line northeast of Gordon.

Louisiana Highway 162

Louisiana Highway 162 (LA 162) runs  in an east–west direction from LA 3 in Benton to LA 157 at Midway, Bossier Parish.

The route heads east-southeast on Fifth Street from an intersection with LA 3 (Benton Road) in Benton. It loses its name as it crosses out of Benton, curving to the east-northeast at Silver Leaf Drive. It makes twists and turns through northern Bossier Parish before reaching its eastern terminus at a T-intersection with LA 157 at a point known as Midway. LA 162 is an undivided two-lane highway for its entire length.

Louisiana Highway 163

Louisiana Highway 163 (LA 163) runs  in a north–south direction from a local road south of Lake Bistineau State Park to LA 164 in Doyline, Webster Parish.

The route begins at an intersection with Gorton Road, south of Lake Bistineau State Park. It heads west for  before turning to the north at an intersection with LA 527. It makes twists and turns through southwestern Webster Parish before entering the village of Doyline. LA 163 continues through Doyline for  before reaching its northern terminus at an intersection with LA 164. LA 163 is an undivided two-lane highway for its entire length.

Louisiana Highway 164

Louisiana Highway 164 (LA 164) runs  in an east–west direction from the concurrent US 79 and US 80 north of Haughton, Bossier Parish to US 371 in Sibley, Webster Parish.

The route heads south-southeast from an intersection with US 79/US 80 in the eastern portion of Bossier Parish. It intersects LA 3227 and continues south-southeast for  before curving to the east at an intersection with LA 614. It begins to parallel the Kansas City Southern railroad tracks and after , it enters Webster Parish. It intersects LA 163 in the village of Doyline. The route ends  later at an intersection with US 371 in Sibley. LA 164 is an undivided two-lane highway for its entire length.

Louisiana Highway 166

Louisiana Highway 166 (LA 166) ran from the Bossier-Webster parish line southwest of Doyline to a point near Lake Bistineau. It is now Parish Line Road.

Louisiana Highway 168

Louisiana Highway 168 (LA 168) runs  in an east–west direction from LA 1 in Rodessa to US 71 in Ida, Caddo Parish.

The route heads northeast from LA 1 in the village of Rodessa, immediately crossing the Kansas City Southern railroad tracks before turning east at Pitts Road. It makes several twists and turns through northern Caddo Parish before having an interchange with I-49 at Exit 245. It curves to the north and then to the east-southeast, before terminating at US 71 in the village of Ida. LA 168 is an undivided two-lane highway, except for its interchange with I-49 where it briefly becomes a divided four-lane highway.

Louisiana Highway 169

Louisiana Highway 169 (LA 169) runs  in a north–south direction from LA 172 west of Keachi, DeSoto Parish to US 71 south of Belcher, Caddo Parish.

The route begins at an intersection with LA 172 in northwestern DeSoto Parish, crossing into Caddo Parish  later. From here, it makes twists and turns through southwestern Caddo Parish, intersecting LA 789 and LA 525 south of and at Spring Ridge, respectively.  north of Spring Ridge, it enters the town of Greenwood. It then begins a  concurrency with US 79/US 80 through Greenwood before splitting off to the north just south of an interchange with I-20 at Exit 3. After this interchange, LA 169 then begins a generally northward course for  before entering the town of Mooringsport. It gains the local name of Greenwood Street, turning east onto Jennings Street at an intersection with LA 767. It intersects LA 538, immediately crossing the Kansas City Southern railroad tracks before continuing east out of Mooringsport. At an intersection with LA 1, LA 169 dips to the south before curving back to the east. On both sides of LA 1, there are old remnants of LA 169 that are now local roads.  after this intersection, LA 169 has an interchange with the newly constructed section of I-49 at Exit 223. LA 169 continues east for a final  before terminating at US 71 northwest of Dixie. LA 169 is an undivided two-lane highway, except for its interchange with I-49 where it briefly becomes a divided four-lane highway.

Louisiana Highway 170

Louisiana Highway 170 (LA 170) runs  in an east–west direction from the Texas state line west of Vivian to a junction with US 71 and LA 3049 in Gilliam, Caddo Parish.

Louisiana Highway 172

Louisiana Highway 172 (LA 172) runs  in an east–west direction from the Texas state line west of Keachi to a junction with LA 5 and LA 789 in Keachi, DeSoto Parish.

Louisiana Highway 173

Louisiana Highway 173 (LA 173) runs  in a general north–south direction from LA 1 in Shreveport to LA 3049 at Dixie, Caddo Parish.

Louisiana Highway 174

Louisiana Highway 174 (LA 174) runs  in an east–west direction from LA 191 west of Converse, Sabine Parish to LA 1 at Lake End, Red River Parish.

The route heads east from LA 191, which runs along the Toledo Bend Reservoir, and intersects US 171 in Converse.  LA 174 proceeds east through Oak Grove and Mitchell and runs concurrent with the otherwise north–south LA 483 between those points.  In Pleasant Hill, LA 174 intersects LA 175 then continues northeast and crosses from Sabine Parish into DeSoto Parish.

The highway passes through the southeast corner of DeSoto Parish briefly before entering Natchitoches Parish.  Here, LA 174 intersects LA 487 at Ajax and passes through an interchange with I-49, connecting to Shreveport and Alexandria.  LA 174 crosses Bayou Pierre into Red River Parish and ends shortly thereafter at an intersection with LA 1 at Lake End, a point on the Red River southeast of Coushatta.

Louisiana Highway 175

Louisiana Highway 175 (LA 175) runs  in a north–south direction from US 171 northwest of Many, Sabine Parish to LA 1 southeast of Shreveport, Caddo Parish.

The route heads north from US 171 just outside Many and intersects LA 120 in Belmont.  It proceeds north through Pleasant Hill, where it intersects LA 174, and crosses from Sabine Parish into DeSoto Parish shortly afterward.  The highway begins to take a more northwesterly course in DeSoto Parish and passes through Pelican on the way to Mansfield.

In Mansfield, LA 175 intersects US 84 and turns west to follow that highway briefly before resuming a northern course through points such as Bayou Pierre and Holly.  Just north of Kingston and a junction with LA 5, LA 175 passes through an interchange with I-49, connecting to Shreveport and Alexandria.  The highway proceeds northeast through Frierson into Caddo Parish, where it reaches its terminus at LA 1 southeast of Shreveport.

Louisiana Highway 176

Louisiana Highway 176 (LA 176) runs  in a north–south direction in Lafayette, located in Lafayette Parish.  It parallels US 167, the city's primary north–south highway, from a point near the downtown area to the northern limit at Carencro.  (North of I-10, US 167 is co-signed with I-49.)

The route begins at US 90 and US 167, which run concurrently along Northwest and Northeast Evangeline Thruway, a couplet of one-way streets. LA 176 initially heads northeast along Jefferson Boulevard as an undivided four-lane highway. After three blocks, it turns north onto Moss Street and passes along the west side of Lafayette's City Park, crossing the Louisiana and Delta Railroad (LDRR) tracks immediately afterward.   later, LA 176 intersects West/East Alexander Street and widens to accommodate a center turning lane. Soon afterward, the highway dips below grade and crosses underneath I-10 just east of Exit 103.

In the pre-1955 state highway system, the current route of LA 176 made up of the entirety of former State Route 675 and State Route C-1384.  LA 176 was created in the 1955 Louisiana Highway renumbering, but it was originally a short connector between LA 94 and the junction of US 90 and US 167 in downtown Lafayette.  When US 90 and US 167 were moved onto the Evangeline Thruway around 1964, US 167 took over much of the original route of LA 176.  For the next 45 years, the route comprised only the portion of Jefferson Boulevard between Evangeline Thruway and the intersection of Simcoe and Surrey Streets (the former junction of LA 94 and LA 728-8).  In 2009, a further re-alignment of routes in the area resulted in the LA 176 designation replacing that of former LA 728-1, greatly lengthening the route.

Louisiana Highway 177

Louisiana Highway 177 (LA 177) runs  in a north–south direction from LA 175 north of Pleasant Hill in DeSoto Parish to the concurrent US 84 and LA 1 at Gahagan, a point west of Coushatta in Red River Parish.

Louisiana Highway 178

Louisiana Highway 178 (LA 178) runs  in an east–west direction from LA 95 in Church Point, Acadia Parish to the concurrent LA 93 and LA 182 in Sunset, St. Landry Parish.

Louisiana Highway 179

Louisiana Highway 179 (LA 179) ran in a north–south direction from US 84 to US 71 in Coushatta.

LA 179 was renumbered as a section of US 371 in 1994.

Louisiana Highway 180

Louisiana Highway 180 (LA 180) runs  in an east–west direction along Jefferson Highway in Pineville, Rapides Parish.

The route is a short connector between US 71 and US 165 at the point where the two highways diverge in Pineville, just north of Alexandria.  It is an undivided two-lane highway for its entire length.

As its local name indicates, the route was once a small part of the historic Jefferson Highway auto trail which extended from New Orleans to Winnipeg, Manitoba, Canada in the late 1910s and 1920s.  When the original state highway system was created in 1921, it became part of States Routes 1 and 5.  In 1926, it also served as part of the original alignment of US 71 until the completion of the O.K. Allen Bridge over the Red River in the 1930s.

LA 180 was created in the 1955 Louisiana Highway renumbering, and its route originally followed the entirety of Jefferson Highway between US 165 Business and US 71.  The deleted portion, though no longer state-maintained, retains destination signage directing traffic from US 165 Business toward US 71 and US 165, heading toward Shreveport and Monroe, respectively.

Louisiana Highway 181

Louisiana Highway 181 (LA 181) runs  from LA 115 in Lone Pine to US 71 in Cheneyville.

Louisiana Highway 182

Louisiana Highway 182 (LA 182) runs  from LA 29 in Whiteville to US 90 north of Raceland.

LA 182 has two hyphenated auxiliary routes, both comprising former alignments, commissioned in 2015. Both routes are located in Broussard and Lafayette:
LA 182-1: West Pinhook Road from LA 182 (West Pinhook Road/Southpark Road) and LA 89-1 (Youngsville Highway/Southpark Road) to South Bernard Road and West Main Street.
LA 182-2: East Main Street from South De Porres Street to St. Etienne Road and LA 182 eastbound.

Louisiana Highway 183

Louisiana Highway 183 (LA 183) runs  in a north–south direction from a point just south of I-20 at Holly Ridge to LA 134 west of Epps in Richland Parish.

Louisiana Highway 184

Louisiana Highway 184 (LA 184) runs  in a north–south direction along Chaffee Road east of Leesville, Vernon Parish.  It connects Fort Polk North, an area within the Fort Polk U.S. Army base with LA 28, the main highway between Leesville and Alexandria.  Though its geographic direction is north–south, LA 184 is signed as an east–west route and treated accordingly in the La DOTD route log.

Eastbound LA 28 connects to Alexandria in neighboring Rapides Parish. LA 185 heads south and intersects LA 468 (Slagle Road).   later, it reaches the guard house at the entrance to Fort Polk. State maintenance ends a short distance later at an intersection with Pendleton Drive, which leads to a residential area within the base.

In the pre-1955 state highway system, LA 184 was designated as State Route C-2040.  LA 184 was created in the 1955 Louisiana Highway renumbering, and its route has remained the same to the present day.

Louisiana Highway 185

Louisiana Highway 185 (LA 185) ran  in a northwest to southeast direction along Northgate Road in Bossier City, Bossier Parish.  It connected Barksdale Air Force Base to LA 72, which leads to several main highways in the area.  Destination signage on LA 72 also directs motorists onto Northgate Road to reach the Eighth Air Force Museum located within the base.

The route began at LA 72 (Old Minden Road) two blocks east of LA 3105 (Airline Drive), which connects to nearby I-20 at Exit 22.  LA 185 headed southeast as an undivided four-lane highway and gained a center turning lane as it entered a residential neighborhood.  It proceeded along the west side of Barksdale AFB until it reached the north gate of the facility.

In the pre-1955 state highway system, LA 185 was designated as State Route C-1333.  LA 185 was created in the 1955 Louisiana Highway renumbering, and its route remained the same while in the state highway system.  After rehabilitation of the roadway in 2013, La DOTD turned the route over to the government of Bossier City as part of its Road Transfer Program.

Louisiana Highway 191

Louisiana Highway 191 (LA 191) runs  in a north–south direction from the Texas state line west of Leesville in Sabine Parish to US 84 east of Logansport, DeSoto Parish.

References

External links
La DOTD State, District, and Parish Maps